Samuel Atkinson (c. 1645 – 1718), of Rotherhithe, Surrey, was an English Member of Parliament.

He was a Member (MP) of the Parliament of England for Harwich from 1698 to 14 February 1699.

References

1645 births
1718 deaths
17th-century English people
People from Rotherhithe
People of the Stuart period
Members of the Parliament of England (pre-1707)